Cédric Garcia (born 28 December 1982 in Toulouse, Haute-Garonne, France ) is a French-Spanish rugby union player. He played for Castres Olympique, Bayonne and US Montauban. Garcia, a scrum-half, also played three games for the Spanish national team in 2004.

References

Living people
1982 births
Spanish rugby union players
Spanish expatriate rugby union players
Spanish expatriate sportspeople in France
Expatriate rugby union players in France
Spain international rugby union players
Rugby union scrum-halves